River Avenue Skate Park is a skate park located in the south Bronx built in 2010 and located next to the B and D train.

History 
The River Ave Skate Park is built on the site of a former Yankee Stadium parking lot. The River Ave Skate Park is part of River Avenue Parks, a series of parks built to offset the public space lost in Macombs Dam Park during the construction of Yankee stadium. The annual Battle For The Bronx Contest is hosted at the park.

References 

Parks in the Bronx
Skateparks in New York City
Skateparks in the United States